Aubette de Magny is a tributary of the river Epte in Val-d'Oise. Its source is near Magny-en-Vexin. It flows into the Epte at Bray-et-Lû.

References

Rivers of France
Rivers of Île-de-France
Rivers of Val-d'Oise